Daryl Cobb is an American author of children's books.

Critical reception 
Kirkus Reviews, in 2013, called Cobb's children's novel Baseball, Bullies & Angels "required reading for kids and parents." In 2014, Baseball, Bullies & Angels was endorsed by Stand For the Silent, a non-profit anti-bullying organization in the United States.

Acting 
While attending Virginia Commonwealth University in Richmond, Virginia, Cobb studied theater, music and learned to play the guitar. He has acted in stage productions including Biloxi Blues by Neil Simon and Fifth of July by Lanford Wilson.

Personal life
Cobb was born December 5, 1961, in Utica, New York. He is the second of five children of Edward John Cobb, a retired high school math teacher, and Jacqueline Lee Bostwick, a homemaker and retired Methodist Minister. The family resided in Hampton, New Jersey in Hunterdon County, where Cobb attended Hampton Public School and graduated from North Hunterdon High School in 1979. Cobb married Joanne M. Salimbeno on November 13, 1993. They have two children together. Cobb and his family reside in Hunterdon County, New Jersey.

He is an investor of the Charter School Growth Fund, which supports the formation of Black-led, independently-run public schools.

Bibliography

References

External links 
 Official Website: with a complete list of publications
 Library of Congress

American children's writers
1961 births
Living people
North Hunterdon High School alumni
People from Hampton, New Jersey
People from Utica, New York
Virginia Commonwealth University alumni